Friend: The Great Legacy (lit. Friend 2) is a 2013 South Korean action film about three generations of gangsters, starring Yu Oh-seong, Kim Woo-bin, and Joo Jin-mo. It is the sequel to the 2001 box-office hit Friend, also directed by Kwak Kyung-taek. Friend: The Great Legacy was released in theaters on 14 November 2013.

Plot
Friend: The Great Legacy begins 17 years after where the previous film left off. Lee Joon-seok, who claimed responsibility for ordering his friend Dong-soo's murder (despite having nothing to do with it), has spent a lot of time behind bars and now he is released to a world that is as unfamiliar to him as the criminal organization he used to lead. With his subordinate Eun-ki now practically parading as the boss, Joon-seok, a leader by nature, secretly embarks on a mission to subvert his current position. He invites Choi Sung-hoon, whom he'd met in prison, and Sung-hoon's gang to join in his plan. Sung-hoon is the twenty-something son of one of Joon-seok's female friends in high school who now works as a bar hostess, and he had been serving a one-year sentence for beating his mother's abusive husband. Having developed a respect for the charismatic Joon-seok in prison, Sung-hoon willingly takes his side. But when he discovers the truth behind his background, this creates great tension between the two. Interspersed are scenes of Joon-seok's own father, Lee Chul-joo as a gangster who founded the criminal organization in 1963 Busan.

The scene ends of flashback 17 years ago of Joon-Seok in a car after leaving Dong-Su behind, it shows Joon-Seok was remorsed of him not being able to protect his childhood friend.

Cast

Yoo Oh-sung as Lee Joon-suk
Joo Jin-mo as Lee Chul-joo 
Kim Woo-bin as Choi Sung-hoon 
Gi Joo-bong as Hyung-doo
Ji Seung-hyun as young Hyung-doo
Jung Ho-bin as Eun-ki
Jang Young-nam as Hye-ji, Sung-hoon's mother
Lee Chul-min as Wig
Lee Jun-hyeok as Jjam-bo
Sun Ho-jin as Song Ki-ho
Jung Soo-hyo as Hae-young
Ahn Jung-bin as Gook-do
Bae Sung-jong as Yong-baek
Go Geon-han as Kim-min
Kang Han-na as Ah-ram
Lee Sang-hoon as Choo Jeop-yi
Won Woong-jae as Yoo shik-yi
Song Ji-ho as Jae-chil
Shin Joon-bum as Bulging head
Park Sung-hyun as young Sang-gon
Yoon Jin-ha as Bug-eye
Choi Jung-hyun as Sang-min
Jang Dong-gun as Dong-soo (cameo)

Box office
Despite the "Restricted" rating it received from the Korea Media Rating Board, Friend: The Great Legacy opened strongly at the box office on 14 November 2013. It attracted 1.06 million admissions over its opening weekend, topping the local box office chart against competitors such as Hollywood blockbuster Thor: The Dark World and Korean film The Five.

Awards and nominations

References

External links
  
 
 
 

2013 films
2013 action films
South Korean action films
South Korean gangster films
Films about organized crime in South Korea
Films set in Ulsan
Films set in Busan
Films shot in Busan
Films directed by Kwak Kyung-taek
2010s Korean-language films
South Korean sequel films
Films set in 1963
Films set in 2010
2010s South Korean films